Monsters vs. Aliens is a 2009 American 3D computer-animated monster comedy film produced by DreamWorks Animation and distributed by Paramount Pictures. The film was directed by Conrad Vernon and Rob Letterman from a screenplay written by Letterman, Maya Forbes, Wallace Wolodarsky, and the writing team of Jonathan Aibel and Glenn Berger. Featuring the voices of Reese Witherspoon, Seth Rogen, Hugh Laurie, Will Arnett, Kiefer Sutherland, Rainn Wilson, Paul Rudd, and Stephen Colbert, the film involves a group of misfit monsters hired by the United States Armed Forces to stop the invasion of an extraterrestrial villain and save the world in exchange for freedom.

It was DreamWorks Animation's first feature film to be directly produced in a stereoscopic 3-D format instead of being converted into 3-D after completion, which added $15 million to the film's budget.

Monsters vs. Aliens was released on March 27, 2009 in the United States in 2-D, RealD 3D, IMAX 3D, and 4DX. The film received generally positive reviews from critics and grossed $381 million worldwide on a $175 million budget. Although not spawning a sequel, the film started a franchise consisting of a short film, B.O.B.'s Big Break, two television specials, Mutant Pumpkins from Outer Space and Night of the Living Carrots, and a television series premiered in 2013 on Nickelodeon.

Plot
In Modesto, California, Susan Murphy is going to be married to weatherman Derek Dietl. Just before the ceremony, a meteorite from a destroyed planet strikes her and its radiation is absorbed into her body. Though she appears unharmed at first, during the ceremony, the energy causes Susan's hair to turn white, and turn her into a 50 foot-tall giantess, accidentally destroying the church in the process. Soon, a U.S. military detachment tranquilizes and captures her. Susan awakens in a top-secret government facility that houses monsters, where she meets General W.R. Monger, the Army officer in charge of the facility and her fellow monster inmates: Dr. Cockroach Ph.D., a scientist who became half-human, half-cockroach after an experiment gone wrong; B.O.B. (Benzoate Ostylezene Bicarbonate), a brainless and living indestructible mass of blue goo that is a result of a food flavoring mutation; Insectosaurus, a massive bug mutated by nuclear radiation standing 350 feet in height that attacked Tokyo; and the Missing Link, a prehistoric 20,000-year-old macho fish-ape hybrid who was thawed from deep ice by scientists. Susan is renamed “Ginormica" by the government and is forbidden any contact with her friends and family.

Meanwhile, on a mysterious spaceship, a squid-like extraterrestrial overlord named Gallaxhar is alerted to the presence of a powerful substance known as "quantonium", and sends a gigantic robotic probe to retrieve it. The probe lands on Earth, where the President of the United States attempts to make first contact by playing it "Axel F", but the probe goes on a destructive attack, heading straight for San Francisco, despite unsuccessful attempts by the U.S. Armed Forces to destroy it. Monger convinces the President to grant the monsters their freedom if they can stop the probe. In San Francisco, the robot detects the quantonium within Susan's body and targets her. At the Golden Gate Bridge, the monsters manage to destroy the giant robot by using parts of the bridge itself.

Gallaxhar sets a course for Earth to obtain the quantonium himself while the now-free Susan returns home with her new friends and reunites with her family. However, her companions alienate themselves from Susan's family due to their inexperience with the real world, while Derek breaks off his engagement with Susan by claiming that he cannot marry someone who would overshadow him and his career. Initially heartbroken, Susan finally realizes that her life was even better as a monster and she promises the other monsters to never underestimate herself again. Suddenly, Susan is pulled into Gallaxhar's ship by a tractor beam. Insectosaurus tries to save her, but is shot down by the ship and seemingly killed.

Onboard the ship, Susan furiously breaks free from her prison cell and chases down Gallaxhar, only to be trapped by a machine that extracts the quantonium from her body, shrinking her back to her original size. Gallaxhar then uses the extracted quantonium to create clones of himself in order to launch a full-scale invasion of Earth. Monger manages to get B.O.B, Link, and Dr. Cockroach on board the ship, where they rescue Susan and make their way to the main power core where Dr. Cockroach sets the ship to self-destruct to prevent the invasion. Susan personally confronts Gallaxhar on the bridge. With time running out, she sends the ball of stored quantonium down on herself, restoring her monstrous size and strength. After rescuing her friends, they flee the ship and are rescued by Monger and Insectosaurus, who has revived and metamorphosed into a giant butterfly. The ship then self-destructs, killing Gallaxhar and his army.

Returning to Modesto, Susan, B.O.B, Dr. Cockroach, Link, and Butterflyosaurus receive a hero's welcome. Hoping to take advantage of Susan's fame for his own career, Derek tries to get back together with her and gain an interview, but she rejects and humiliates him live on camera. Monger then arrives to inform the monsters that a monstrous snail named "Escargantua" is slowly making its way to Paris after falling into a nuclear reactor, resulting in the heroes taking off to confront the new menace.

Voice cast

Her exposure to quantonium also makes her hair color change and turn from brown to white and gives her super-strength and physical-imperviousness.
 Seth Rogen as B.O.B. (Benzoate Ostylezene Bicarbonate), an indestructible gelatinous mass created when a tomato was injected with a genetically-modified ranch-flavored dessert topping. He can devour and digest almost any substance. Despite having consciousness, he literally and figuratively lacks a brain and is thus the comic relief.
 Hugh Laurie as Dr. Cockroach Ph.D., a brilliant scientist who attempted to imbue himself with the resilience and abilities of a cockroach, with the side effect of his head becoming that of a human-sized cockroach.
 Will Arnett as The Missing Link (usually referred to as "Link"), a 20,000-year-old fish-ape humanoid who was found frozen and thawed out by scientists, only to escape and wreak havoc at his old lagoon habitat of Cocoa Beach, Florida.
Insectosaurus, formerly a  grub transformed and mutated by nuclear radiation into a 350 foot (106.7 m) monster with the ability to shoot silk out of his nose. He is unable to speak clearly and is mesmerized by bright light. He has a close bond with Link, who can understand what he's saying.
 Rainn Wilson as Gallaxhar, an evil alien overlord intent on collecting quantonium – the substance that transformed Susan into Ginormica – to give his cloning machine enough power to generate an army of clones of himself to conquer Earth. He is served by gigantic robotic probes. He claims to have suffered several traumas in his youth (which are left mostly unintelligible to the viewer, due to him telling Ginormica his story while being repeatedly photocopied to create his clones), driving him to destroy his own homeworld, and plans to make a new one on Earth. 
 Amy Poehler as Gallaxhar's computer.
 Kiefer Sutherland as General W. R. Monger, a military leader who runs a top-secret facility where monsters are kept, it is his plan to fight the invading aliens with the imprisoned monsters in exchange for their freedom. In a scene during the credits, he claims to be 90 years old, in spite of his youthful appearance.
 Stephen Colbert as President Hathaway, the impulsive and rather dimwitted president of the United States. Not wanting to be remembered as "the President in office when the world came to an end", he agrees with General Monger's "Monsters vs. Aliens" plan when the U.S. Military is unable to defeat the robot probe sent by Gallaxhar.
 Paul Rudd as Derek Dietl, a local weatherman and Susan's ex-fiancé. He jumps at whatever opportunity he has to boost his career, which causes him to place his job and himself before his relationship with Susan, canceling their plans to have a romantic honeymoon in Paris to land an anchorman job in Fresno, California.
 Jeffrey Tambor as Carl Murphy, Susan's overemotional father.
 Julie White as Wendy Murphy, Susan's loving mother.
 Renée Zellweger as Katie, a woman whose date with her boyfriend Cuthbert is interrupted by the landing of Gallaxhar's robot.
 John Krasinski as Cuthbert, Katie's boyfriend.
 Ed Helms as News Reporter
 David James Koch provided the voice of the character for the Australian release of the film.

Production
The film started as an adaptation of a horror comic book, Rex Havoc, in which a monster hunter Rex and his team of experts called "Ass-Kickers of the Fantastic" fight against ghouls, ghosts and other creatures. The earliest development goes back to 2002, when DreamWorks first filed for a Rex Havoc trademark. In a plot synopsis revealed in 2005, Rex was to assemble a team of monsters, including Ick!, Dr. Cockroach, the 50,000 Pound Woman and Insectosaurus, to fight aliens for disrupting cable TV service. In the following years, the film's story diverged away from the original Rex Havoc, with directors Conrad Vernon and Rob Letterman finally creating the storyline from scratch.

Production designer David James stated that the film is "a return to what made us nerds in the first place," getting classic movie monsters and relaunching them in a contemporary setting. Director Conrad Vernon added that he found it would be a great idea to take hideous monsters and giving them personalities and satirizing the archetypes. Each of the five monsters has traits traceable to sci-fi/horror B movies from the 1950s, 1960s and 1970s, although none is a mere copy of an older character. Susan, who grows to be 49 feet 11 inches tall into Ginormica, was inspired by Attack of the 50 Foot Woman. Dr. Cockroach represents The Fly and The Curse of Frankenstein, while B.O.B. is an amalgam of slithering and slimy characters that were featured in the films, including The Blob and The Crawling Eye. Insectosaurus, a 350-foot-tall monster, is a nod to the 1961 Kaiju film Mothra. According to Vernon, the Missing Link has no direct inspiration. He "just represents anything prehistoric that comes back to life and terrorizes people." For the San Francisco sequence, the producers researched many films and photographs for an accurate depiction of the city, and filmed animator Line Andersen, who had a similar body type to Ginormica—tall, thin, and athletic-looking—walking alongside a scale model of San Francisco, to capture better how a person not comfortable with being too big with an environment would walk around it.

Ed Leonard, CTO of DreamWorks Animation, says it took approximately 45.6 million computing hours to make Monsters vs. Aliens, more than eight times as many as the original Shrek. Several hundred Hewlett-Packard xw8600 workstations were used, along with a 'render farm' of HP ProLiant blade servers with over 9,000 server processor cores, to process the animation sequence. Animators used 120 terabytes of data to complete the film. They used 6 TB for an explosion scene.

Starting with Monsters vs. Aliens, all feature films released by DreamWorks Animation were produced in a stereoscopic 3D format, using Intel's InTru3D technology. 2D, RealD 3D, IMAX 3D, and 4DX versions were released.

Release

Marketing
To promote the 3D technology that is used in Monsters vs. Aliens, DreamWorks ran a 3D trailer before halftime in the U.S. broadcast of Super Bowl XLIII on February 1, 2009. Due to the limitations of television technology at the time, ColorCode 3-D glasses were distributed at SoBe stands at major national grocers. The Monsters, except Ginormica and Insectosaurus, also appeared in a 3D SoBe commercial airing after the trailer. Bank of America gave away vouchers that covered the cost of an upgrade to a 3D theatrical viewing of the film for its customers.

Home media
Monsters vs. Aliens was released to DVD and Blu-ray in the United States and Canada on September 29, 2009 and on October 26, 2009, in the United Kingdom. The home release for both the DVD and Blu-ray format only contain the 2D version of the movie. However, the release is packaged with a new short, B.O.B.'s Big Break, which is in the anaglyphic 3D format that requires red and cyan glasses. Also included are four pairs of 3D glasses. On January 6, 2010, it was announced that a 3D version would be released on Blu-ray. On February 24, a tentative March release date was set for the United Kingdom, where anyone who buys a Samsung 3D TV or 3D Blu-ray player will get a copy. On March 8, it was reported that the 3D Blu-ray would be released in the United States, also with Samsung 3D products, on March 21. As of February 2011, 9.0 million home entertainment units were sold worldwide. In July 2014, the film's distribution rights were purchased by DreamWorks Animation from Paramount Pictures and transferred to 20th Century Fox; the rights are now owned by Universal Pictures.

Reception

Box office
On its opening weekend, the film opened at number 1, grossing $59.3 million in 4,104 theaters. Of that total, the film grossed an estimated $5.2 million in IMAX 3D theatres, becoming the fifth-highest-grossing IMAX 3D debut, behind Star Trek, Transformers: Revenge of the Fallen, The Dark Knight, and Watchmen. The film grossed $198.4 million in the United States and Canada, making it the second-highest-grossing animated movie of the year in these regions behind Up. Worldwide, it is the third highest-grossing animated film of 2009 with a total of $381.5 million behind Up and Ice Age: Dawn of the Dinosaurs. It was the highest-grossing film worldwide in Witherspoon's career until Sing overtook it in 2017.

Critical response
The critical consensus reads: "Though it doesn't approach the depth of the best animated films, Monsters vs. Aliens has enough humor and special effects to entertain moviegoers of all ages." On Metacritic, which assigns a normalized rating from mainstream critics, the film has received a score of 56 out of 100 based on 35 reviews, which indicates "mixed reviews". Audiences polled by CinemaScore gave the film an A- grade, on an A+ to F scale.

Roger Ebert of the Chicago Sun-Times gave the film two and a half stars out of four, writing, "I suppose kids will like this movie", though he "didn't find [it] rich with humor". Peter Travers of Rolling Stone gave the film three-and-a-half stars out of four and wrote that "WALL-E had more charm, more soul, more everything. But there's enough merry mischief here to satisfy, even if you're way past puberty."

Accolades
In 2009, the film was nominated for four Annie Awards, including Voice Acting in a Feature Production for Hugh Laurie. Reese Witherspoon and Seth Rogen were both nominated for best voice actor and actress at the 2010 Kids' Choice Awards for voicing Ginormica and B.O.B, but lost to Jim Carrey for Disney's A Christmas Carol. Monsters vs. Aliens was also nominated for Best Animated film but lost to Pixar'''s Up. On June 24, 2009, the film won the Saturn Award for Best Animated Film.

Expanded franchise

Cancelled sequel 
Despite its success in the United States market, DreamWorks Animation's CEO, Jeffrey Katzenberg was quoted in the Los Angeles Times that a sequel would not be made because of the film's weak performance in some key international markets. "There was enough of a consensus from our distribution and marketing folks in certain parts of the world that 'doing a sequel' would be pushing a boulder up a hill." After the release of Megamind, Katzenberg commented about Shark Tale, Monsters vs. Aliens, and Megamind: "All shared an approach and tone and idea of parody, and did not travel well internationally. We don't have anything like that coming on our schedule now."

 Television series 
Despite not being followed by a sequel, the film started a franchise with a video game, a short film titled B.O.B.'s Big Break and two television specials titled Monsters vs. Aliens: Mutant Pumpkins from Outer Space and Night of the Living Carrots'', respectively. A television series based on the film also started airing on Nickelodeon on March 23, 2013, which was cancelled after one season due to low ratings, poor reviews and the network's desire to refocus on making the more "Nickish" shows.

References

External links

2000s American animated films
2000s monster movies
2009 3D films
2009 computer-animated films
2009 films
3D animated films
Alien invasions in films
American 3D films
American computer-animated films
American monster movies
American robot films
Animated films about extraterrestrial life
Animated films about robots
DreamWorks Animation animated films
Films about cloning
Films about giants
Films about size change
Films adapted into television shows
Films directed by Conrad Vernon
Films directed by Rob Letterman
Films scored by Henry Jackman
Films set in Fresno, California
Animated films set in San Francisco
Films set in the San Francisco Bay Area
Films with screenplays by Conrad Vernon
Films with screenplays by Jonathan Aibel and Glenn Berger
Films with screenplays by Rob Letterman
IMAX films
Monsters vs. Aliens (franchise)
Paramount Pictures animated films
Paramount Pictures films
2000s English-language films
Animated films about insects
Animated films about apes
Films about fictional presidents of the United States